Michael Patrick Dease (born August 25, 1982) is an American jazz tenor and bass trombonist, composer and producer.  He also plays saxophone, trumpet, flugelhorn, bass and piano.

Biography 
Michael Dease was born in Augusta, Georgia and attended John S. Davidson Fine Arts Magnet High School, where he studied saxophone and voice. During his time as a high school student he achieved all-state honors on the latter instrument for three years in a row.

At age 17, Michael taught himself to play trombone, and was soon invited to join the inaugural class of the Juilliard jazz studies program by Wycliffe Gordon. Dease would go on to earn both his bachelor's and master's degrees while at the school. His teachers included Wycliffe Gordon, Steve Turre, Vincent Gardner, John Drew and Joseph Alessi.  While at Juilliard, Dease won many awards, including the Frank Rosolino Award, J.J. Johnson Award, the Sammy Nestico Jazz Composers Award, ASCAP Young Jazz Composer Award, and the Fish Middleton Jazz Competition.

He began his career in Illinois Jacquet's Big Band in 2002, and has performed as a featured member of the Dizzy Gillespie All-Star Big Band, Christian McBride Big Band, Roy Hargrove Big Band, Nicholas Payton Big Band, Jimmy Heath Big Band and the Charles Tolliver Big Band.  Dease also performs with small groups led by Claudio Roditi, Rodney Whitaker, Wycliffe Gordon, and David Sanborn.  In addition to performance, Dease serves and president and producer at his jazz record label, D Clef Records.

Dease has toured extensively throughout  Europe, Asia, North America and Latin America.  Previous engagements include the Nice Jazz Festival, North Sea Jazz Festival, Tims Jazz Festival, Montreal Jazz Festival, Toronto Jazz Festival, Monterey Jazz Festival and the Spoleto Music Festival.  He was a guest artist at the International Trombone Festival June 22–25, 2011 at Vanderbilt University in Nashville, Tennessee.

Dease's album Grace (2010) received excellent reviews from publications such as Jazz Times, All About Jazz and The Guardian (UK).

Michael Dease was interviewed by Linus Wyrsch on "The Jazz Hole" for breakthruradio.com in April 2013 - Michael Dease Interview by breakthruradio.com

Educator 
Dease had conducted master classes and workshops at universities and conservatories around the world, including the University of Costa Rica, Osaka University, Michigan State University, Augusta State University, Broward College, Simpson College, Scranton University, and Northeastern University.

Currently Dease holds the position of Associate Professor of Jazz Trombone at the Michigan State University College of Music. He has also held similar positions at Queens College, CUNY, and The New School for Jazz and Contemporary Music in New York City. Dease performs exclusively on Yamaha Trombones, and plays the YSL-891Z.

Discography

As leader 
The Takeover (Self-released, 2005)
Dease Bones (D-Clef, 2007)
Clarity (BluesBack Records, 2008)
Grace (Jazz Legacy Productions, 2010)
Coming Home (D-Clef, 2013)
Relentless (Posi-Tone, 2014)
Decisions (Posi-Tone, 2015)
Let's Get Real (Spice of Life [Japan], 2015)
Father Figure (Posi-Tone, 2016)
All These Hands (Posi-Tone, 2017)
Reaching Out (Posi-Tone, 2018)
Bonafide (Posi-Tone, 2018)
Never More Here (Posi-Tone, 2019)
Give It All You Got (Posi-Tone, 2021)

As sideman 
with Sharel Cassity
Relentless (Jazz Legacy Productions, 2009)

with Matthew Garrison 
Familiar Places (D-Clef, 2010)

with Dizzy Gillespie All-Star Big Band
I'm BeBoppin' Too (Half Note, 2008)

with Illinois Jacquet
Swingin' Live With Illinois Jacquet: His Final Performance (Jacquet, 2006)

with Alicia Keys
As I Am (J Records, 2007)

with Christian McBride Big Band
The Good Feeling (Mack Avenue, 2011)
Bringin' It (Mack Avenue, 2017)

with Claudio Roditi
Simpatico (Resonance, 2010)

with Charles Tolliver Big Band
Emperor March: Live at the Blue Note (Half Note, 2009)

External links
Michael Dease's Website:  http://www.michaeldease.com
Michael Yamaha Artist: http://www.yamaha.com/artists/michaeldease.html
Michael Dease Interview by breakthruradio.com

References

1.http://www.allmusic.com/artist/michael-dease-p1008210/biography
2.http://www.guardian.co.uk/music/2010/oct/24/michael-dease-grace-review

Living people
American jazz trombonists
Male trombonists
American jazz composers
American male jazz composers
1982 births
Musicians from Augusta, Georgia
21st-century trombonists
21st-century American male musicians
Christian McBride Big Band members
Posi-Tone Records artists